The Guanche mummies of Necochea are two mummies of Guanche individuals, who were the ancient Berber autochthones of the Canary Islands. The specimens are currently on display at the Museo de la Naturaleza y el Hombre in Santa Cruz de Tenerife.

The Necochea mummies are so-called because they were first exhibited in 2003 at the Museo Civil de Ciencias Naturales in Necochea, Province of Buenos Aires, Argentina.

These two individuals, male and female respectively, the woman would have between 20 and 24 years and is wrapped in a bundle of pigskin. The other mummy is a man between 25 and 29 years and has a special feature, its position with legs bent with his heels against his buttocks. According to experts, the mummies date back to the ninth century.

The exact place on the island where the mummies come from is not known. It is believed that one of the mummies may even come from a burial cave in the Barranco de Guayonje in Tacoronte and the other mummy of La Orotava, but according to others could come from Barranco de Herques in Güímar. They were part of the collection of a private museum in Tacoronte. In the nineteenth century it was sold to the La Plata Museum in Argentina, reaching the hands of an unidentified collector. They were later transferred to the city of Necochea, until, in 2003, were returned to Tenerife. This was the first return of mummified human remains from the Americas to Europe in the history of archeology.

Data on the mummies 
 Gender: male and female.
 Age: 20 and 24 years female mummy and 25 and 29 years male mummy.
 Culture: Guanche.
 Type of mummification: mummies ceremonial.
 Type of burial: burial cave.
 Location: It is not known exactly, but possibly were found in the present municipalities of Tacoronte, La Orotava or in Güímar.
 Shown at: The Museum of Nature and Man (Santa Cruz de Tenerife), along with other Guanche mummies preserved.
 Interesting facts: The woman is wrapped in a shroud particularly pigskin and man has legs bent with the heels against the buttocks.

See also 
Guanche mummy of Madrid
Mummy of San Andrés
Museo de la Naturaleza y el Hombre

References 

Guanche mummies